Edmund Bastard (1758–1816) of Sharpham, Ashprington, Devon, was a British Tory politician. He was the second son of Colonel William Bastard of Kitley House, Yealmpton, Devon by his wife Anne Worsley.

He was Member of Parliament (MP) for Dartmouth from 1787 to 1812. In 1787, he was elected unopposed, after in August 1787 George Rose recommended him to William Pitt. In the Parliament, only two speeches of him are recorded, on 26 and 28 May 1788, on a bill to regulate fishery in Newfoundland. This was related with the position of Darthmouth as one of the main ports of the Newfoundland trade.

On 1 July 1783 Bastard married Jane Pownoll (died 1822), daughter and heiress of Captain Philemon Pownoll (died 1780), Royal Navy, the builder of Sharpham House, by whom he had children including his eldest son and heir, Edmund Pollexfen Bastard (1784–1838), who succeeded John Pollexfen Bastard as MP for Devonshire; and second son, Captain John Bastard (died 1835), Royal Navy, of Sharpham, who succeeded his father as member for Dartmouth. Bastard died in June 1816.

Disambiguation

John Pollexfen Bastard—John Bastard RN and Edmund Pollexfen Bastard—Edmund Bastard

References

 John Burke, Bastard of Kitley, A Genealogical and Heraldic History of the Commoners of Great Britain and Ireland Henry Colburn London 1834.

1758 births
1816 deaths
People from Dartmouth, Devon
Tory MPs (pre-1834)
Members of the Parliament of the United Kingdom for Dartmouth
British MPs 1784–1790
British MPs 1790–1796
British MPs 1796–1800
UK MPs 1801–1802
UK MPs 1802–1806
UK MPs 1806–1807
UK MPs 1807–1812
UK MPs 1812–1818